Erythrokeratodermia is a group of keratinization disorders.

Types include:
 Erythrokeratodermia variabilis
 Erythrokeratodermia with ataxia
 Progressive symmetric erythrokeratodermia

References

Genodermatoses